Aipysurus foliosquama, also known as the leaf-scaled sea snake, is a  species of venomous sea snake in the family Elapidae.  It was formerly endemic to the Ashmore and Cartier Islands of Australia, having thought to have become extinct there. In 2015, the snake was discovered in seagrass beds of Shark Bay off Western Australia.

Taxonomy 
The species was first described in 1926. The combination Smithohydrophis foliosquama (Kharin 1981) is recognised as a synonym.

Description 
The recorded length is around 800 millimetres and coloration is purple brown.
A poorly known species, the diet is known to consist of wrasse and gudgeon fish that are pursued through coral outcrops and crevices.

Distribution and habitat 
The distribution range of the species has contracted since its first identification, and is currently known from a declining population inhabiting Shark Bay on the western coast of Australia.
The leaf-scaled sea snake prefers waters up to 10 metres in depth.

In December 2015 a population of the snakes was found living in seagrass beds of Shark Bay off Western Australia. Previously, its only known habitats were some 1,700 km away in the Ashmore and Hibernia Reefs in the Timor Sea, from where it had since disappeared.

Conservation status 
The range of Aipysurus foliosquama has significantly decreased and population is significantly declining, the IUCN lists their status as data deficient. It  is listed as one of The World's 100 Most Threatened Species.

References

External links

foliosquama
Snakes of Australia
Critically endangered fauna of Australia
Reptiles described in 1926